Sandiwara (Indonesian term for: "drama") is a genre of traditional theatrical drama of Indonesia. In general, it refers to any kind of drama or theatrical performances, and literally sandiwara means "to pretend" or "to act". However, the term is often used to describe a genre of traditional drama of West Java. Sandiwara Sunda is a type of sandiwara performed in Sundanese and presenting Sundanese themes, folklores and stories. It is quite similar to Javanese ketoprak or wayang orang.

Today, this traditional drama has become less popular. Many sandiwara troupes are struggling to survive, including the once famous Sandiwara Miss Tjitjih.

Form 
Sandiwara might be accompanied with a live traditional gamelan degung orchestra, modern electric organ and guitar, or recorded music. Sometimes traditional tembang Sunda and jaipongan dance interludes are included during the play. The play is usually presented in Sundanese, Indonesian or Cirebon dialect. Some thriving local sandiwara troupes can be found in the town of Indramayu, West Java, where it is a popular form of traditional entertainment. A notable sandiwara troupe is Miss Tjitjih, established in Batavia, Dutch East Indies back in 1928.

Theme
Unlike the European-influenced toneel that often adapt Western themes and adaptation of foreign plays, sandiwara is mostly derived from local sources; including folklore such as "Sangkuriang" and "Lutung Kasarung", epic stories such as "King Siliwangi of Pajajaran", local Sundanese comedy such as "Kabayan" to local horror stories and urban legends such as "Si Manis Jembatan Ancol" to "Beranak dalam Kubur" retelling the legend of demonic female spirit Kuntilanak.

See also

 Ketoprak
 Ronggeng
 Toneel
 Wayang wong
 Javanese culture
 Balinese culture

References

External links
 Sandiwara Sunda Miss Tjitjih in Youtube

Javanese culture
Sundanese culture
Theatre in Indonesia
Traditional drama and theatre of Indonesia
Dances of Java